Curzon may refer to:

People

Americans
 Aria Curzon (born 1987), American actress
 Walter de Curzon Poultney (1845–1929), one of Baltimore, Maryland's most colorful and flamboyant high-society members

Britons
 Christopher Curzon (born 1958), retired English cricketer
 Clifford Curzon (1907–1982), English classical pianist
 Ephraim Curzon (born ), English soldier and rugby footballer
 Frederic Curzon (1899–1973), English composer, conductor and musician
 George Curzon, 1st Marquess Curzon of Kedleston (1859–1925), British statesman, who served as the Governor General of India
 Grace Curzon, Marchioness Curzon of Kedleston (1885–1958), United States-born British marchioness
 Mary Curzon, Baroness Curzon of Kedleston (1870–1906), British peeress of American background
 Robert Curzon, 14th Baron Zouche (1810–1873), English traveller, diplomat and author
 Sarah Anne Curzon (1833–1898), British-born Canadian poet, journalist, editor, and playwright

French
 Alfred de Curzon (1820–1895), French painter

Places
 Birmingham Curzon Street railway station, the planned High Speed 2 terminus station in the city centre of Birmingham, England
 Birmingham Curzon Street railway station (1838–1966), a railway station in central Birmingham, England
 Curzon Community Cinema, Clevedon, one of the oldest continually running purpose-built cinemas in the world
 Curzon Hall, a British Raj-era building and home of the Faculty of Sciences at the University of Dhaka
 Curzon Street, located within the exclusive Mayfair district of London
 Curzon Village, a constituent area of the Canadian town of Woody Point, Newfoundland and Labrador
 Curzon, Missouri, an unincorporated community in Holt County, in the U.S. state of Missouri
 Curzon, Vendée, a commune in the Vendée department in the Pays de la Loire region in western France

Ships
 , a Captain-class frigate of the British Royal Navy
  (originally HMS Curzon), a wooden-hulled Ton-class minesweeper of the Royal Navy

Other
 Curzon, a famous cologne sold by Geo. F. Trumper
 Curzon Artificial Eye, a British film distributor
 Curzon Ashton F.C., an association football club based in Ashton-under-Lyne, Greater Manchester, England
 Curzon Cinemas, a chain of cinemas based in the United Kingdom
 Curzon Dax, a character from the TV series Star Trek: Deep Space Nine
 Curzon Line, a historical demarcation line of World War II